Jalan Batu Kawa–Tondong is a major highway in Kuching Division in Sarawak, Malaysia. This highway is also part of the Pan Borneo Highway network.

Malaysian Federal Roads